Carlos Botín (14 January 1900 – 27 November 1988) was a Spanish sprinter. He competed in the men's 100 metres at the 1920 Summer Olympics.

References

1900 births
1988 deaths
Athletes (track and field) at the 1920 Summer Olympics
Spanish male sprinters
Olympic athletes of Spain
Athletes from Madrid